This article lists political parties in Scotland.

Overview
The Scottish National Party (SNP) is the main political party in Scotland which primarily supports Scotland becoming an independent nation. They have also supported further devolution as a progression towards independence. They are overall centre-left, and sometimes considered big-tent, advocating social democracy, nuclear disarmament and closer ties to the European Union. They were founded in 1934 and formed a permanent grouping in House of Commons in 1967. Their best election result in the 20th century was at the general election of October 1974 in which they won 11 of Scotland's 72 Westminster seats as well as around 30% of the popular vote, however they lost all but two of these seats in 1979. Support for the party was bolstered under the leadership of Alex Salmond, who in 2011 led the SNP to their best electoral performance to date, in which they became the first party in the devolved Scottish Parliament to win a majority of seats. They form the Scottish government, and are now led by Scotland's First Minister, Nicola Sturgeon. They have 64 Members of the Scottish Parliament (MSPs) and 45 Members of the Parliament of the United Kingdom (MPs).

The Scottish Conservatives are the Scottish wing of the UK-wide Conservative Party. They were founded in 1965 out of the merger of the Scottish Unionist Party, which had been a dominant political force in Scotland for much of the early 20th century, winning the majority of votes and seats in the 1931 general election and 1955 general election. However the party went into decline, being reduced from 21 Scottish seats in 1983, to 10 in 1987. The 1997 general election was a catastrophe for the Scottish Conservatives, who were left with no Scottish seats whatsoever. However the party won 18 seats in the Scottish Parliament in the 1999 election due to proportional representation. From 2001 to 2017, the Conservatives held one Scottish seat in the UK parliament, but had its best result in the 21st century in the 2017 general election when it returned 13 seats and just short of a third of the vote. Like the wider UK Conservative Party, the party is a centre-right party, which promotes conservatism and British unionism. They currently have 31 MSPs, led in the Scottish Parliament by Douglas Ross, and 6 MPs, including Ross himself.

Scottish Labour is the Scottish wing of the Great Britain-wide Labour Party. It was the most successful party in Scottish elections from 1964 to 2007. Like the wider UK Labour Party, they are centre-left and they promote British unionism. They first overtook the Conservatives as Scotland's largest party at the 1959 general election. In 1997, the UK Labour Party under Tony Blair offered Scotland a referendum on devolution which was passed with around 74% of the electorate in favour. From 1999 to 2007, they were in power in the Scottish Parliament through a coalition with the Liberal Democrats. From 2008 to 2011, the party was led by Iain Gray in the Scottish Parliament, who announced his resignation after the party's defeat at the 2011 Scottish election. Johann Lamont became leader in 2011 and resigned in 2014 after an internal dispute within the party. Subsequently, they were led by Jim Murphy, Kezia Dugdale and Richard Leonard. They currently have one MP and 22 MSPs.  they are led by Anas Sarwar MSP.

The Scottish Liberal Democrats are the Scottish wing of the Great Britain-wide Liberal Democrats party. It is a centrist, social liberal and British unionist party. The British Liberal Democrats they are part of were formed in 1988 when the Liberal Party and the Social Democratic Party merged. Their leader is Alex Cole-Hamilton. Since the formation of the Conservative–Liberal Democrat coalition at Westminster, support for the Liberal Democrats has fallen sharply, and the party won five seats at the 2011 Scottish parliamentary election. They also lost their Scottish MEP at the 2014 European elections. They also lost 10 of their 11 House of Commons seats at the 2015 general election, with Deputy Leader Alistair Carmichael the only MP managing to keep his seat. They currently have four MSPs and four MPs.

The Scottish Greens sit between the centre-left and the left-wing. The party promotes green politics, Scottish independence, equality and radical democracy. It retains close ties with the Green Party of England and Wales and the Green Party Northern Ireland, having all originated in the breakup of the UK Green Party. However, all three parties are now fully independent. The Scottish Greens won their first seat in the Scottish Parliament in 1999 and currently have 7 MSPs, but have never returned any MPs.

Reform UK Scotland is the Scottish wing of the UK-wide Reform UK. It is a Eurosceptic and right-wing populist party. The party gained its first elected representative in January 2021, when sitting independent MSP Michelle Ballantyne joined the party and became leader of the party in Scotland. Ballantyne was previously a Conservative MSP. She resigned from the party in November 2020, citing differences with the new leader Douglas Ross before joining. Ballantyne lost this seat in the 2021 Scottish Scottish Parliament election, leaving the party with no elected representatives in Scotland.

The Alba Party is a Scottish independence supporting party formed in February 2021 and led by former First Minister of Scotland Alex Salmond. Shortly after it announced its plans to run in the 2021 Scottish Parliament election, two SNP MPs defected to the new party, making the Alba Party the fourth largest Scottish party at the Westminster Parliament after the SNP, Scottish Liberal Democrats and Scottish Conservatives. In the run up to the 2021 Scottish Parliament election there was a succession of SNP representatives defecting to the party. The party failed to win any seats in the 2021 Scottish Parliament election, after attracting only 1.7% of the vote.

Parties with elected representation

Scottish Parliament and/or House of Commons
There are six parties in Scotland that have elected representation in either the Scottish Parliament or the House of Commons. All except the Scottish Greens and the Alba Party have representation in both. In addition, all parties except the Alba Party have elected representation at the local government level.

Local government

There are three parties in Scotland that have elected representation only at the local government level.

Parties with no elected representation

Notable registered parties
There are a number of notable registered parties in Scotland with no elected representation. Some operate exclusively within Scotland, while others may also be active in other parts of the United Kingdom.

Historical and deregistered parties

Notable historical parties

Notable deregistered parties

See also

 Lists of political parties
 Politics of Scotland
 Elections in Scotland

Notes

References

External links
 Electoral Commission official site of the Electoral Commission

 
Political parties
Political parties
Scotland